Samrala Sharif is a well-developed village 5 km south of Kotla Arab Ali Khan, and 35 km away from Gujrat.

There are various stories about history of the village that date back to 15th century, but it is most commonly acknowledged that the village is located roughly 700m from where it originally was. After a flood, it was moved to its current location. The literacy rate is very high and the village is well-facilitated with schools, shops, post offices and roads from Gujrat-Bhimber.

Populated places in Gujrat District